The program of the Girl Scouts of the USA is administered through local councils.

Each council covers a geographic area of the United States, that may vary in size from a single U.S. county to multiple U.S. states.

List of local councils
Local councils of the Girl Scouts of the USA, within U.S. states, and in Insular areas and Territories of the United States, currently includes:

 Alaska
 Arizona Cactus-Pine
 Black Diamond
 California's Central Coast
 Caribe
 Carolinas Peaks to Piedmont
 Central & Southern New Jersey
 Central and Western Massachusetts
 Central California South
 Central Illinois
 Central Indiana
 Central Maryland
 Central Texas
 Chesapeake Bay
 Citrus
 Colonial Coast
 Colorado
 Commonwealth
 Connecticut
 Dakota Horizons
 Desert Southwest
 Diamonds of Ark. Okla. & Texas
 Eastern Iowa and West Illinois
 Eastern Massachusetts
 Eastern Missouri
 Eastern Oklahoma
 Eastern Pennsylvania
 Eastern South Carolina
 Eastern Washington and North Idaho
 Farthest North
 Florida Panhandle
 Gateway
 Greater Atlanta
 Greater Chicago and NW Indiana
 Greater Iowa
 Greater Los Angeles
 Greater Mississippi
 Greater New York
 Greater South Texas
 Green and White Mountains
 Gulfcoast
 Hawaii
 Heart of Central California
 Heart of Michigan
 Heart of New Jersey
 Heart of Pennsylvania
 Heart of the Hudson
 Heart of the South
 Historic Georgia
 Hornets' Nest
 Jersey Shore
 Kansas Heartland
 Kentuckiana
 Kentucky's Wilderness Road
 Louisiana East
 Louisiana-Pines to the Gulf
 Maine
 Manitou
 Michigan Shore to Shore
 Middle Tennessee
 Minnesota and Wisconsin Lakes and Pines
 Minnesota and Wisconsin River Valleys
 Missouri Heartland
 Montana and Wyoming
 Nassau County
 Nation's Capital
 NE Kansas and NW Missouri
 New Mexico Trails
 North Carolina Coastal Pines
 Northeast Ohio
 North-Central Alabama
 Northeast Texas
 Northeastern New York
 Northern California
 Northern Illinois
 Northern Indiana-Michiana
 Northern New Jersey
 Northwestern Great Lakes
 NYPENN Pathways
 Ohio's Heartland
 Orange County
 Scouting in Washington
 San Diego
 San Gorgonio
 San Jacinto
 South Carolina - Mountains to Midlands
 Sierra Nevada
 Silver Sage
 Southeast Florida
 Southeastern Michigan
 Southeastern New England
 Southern Alabama
 Southern Appalachians
 Southern Arizona
 Southern Illinois
 Southern Nevada
 Southwest Indiana
 Southwest Texas
 Spirit of Nebraska
 Suffolk County
 Texas Oklahoma Plains
 Tropical Florida
 USAGSO (American Scouting overseas)
 Utah
 Virginia Skyline
 West Central Florida
 Western New York
 Western Ohio
 Western Oklahoma
 Western Pennsylvania
 Western Washington
 Wisconsin - Badgerland
 Wisconsin Southeast

See also
 
 
 List of councils (Boy Scouts of America)

External links
  Girlscouts.org: official Girl Scouts of the United States of America website
 Girlscouts.org:  'Find a local Girl Scouts Council' interactive searchpage

 
Girl Scouts, local councils and districts
Local councils
Scouting-related lists